Highway 755 is a highway in the Canadian province of Saskatchewan. It runs from the Hazel Dell Access Road near Hazel Dell to Highway 47 near Preeceville.

See also 
Roads in Saskatchewan
Transportation in Saskatchewan

References 

755